Central Marchigiano refers to a group of Romance varieties spoken in the central part of the Marche region of Italy, in an area that includes the provinces of Ancona, Macerata and Fermo. It is one of the Central Italian dialects and forms part of a continuum that also encompasses Umbrian and Tuscan. There are notable grammatical, lexical and idiomatic differences between Marchigiano and standard Italian, but it is considered, along with the rest of Central Italian dialects, to be fairly intelligible to a speaker of Standard Italian.

According to internal variation, Marchigiano is divided into two main areas:
 The dialect of Ancona (Anconitano), to which the dialects of Osimo, Jesi and Fabriano also belong.
The dialect of Macerata and Fermo (Fermano-Maceratese) and that of Camerino.

Common features 
Features that distinguish Marchigiano in general from Italian include:
The fact that the general masculine singular ending in nouns and adjectives may be , rather than the  found in Italian.
The vocalization of older .
Isomorphism of certain third-person plural and first-person singular verb endings, such that  may mean either 'he/she/it loves' or 'they love'.

The verbs meaning 'be' and 'have' inflect as follows in the present indicative:

Features of the three areas

Ancona dialect 
The Ancona dialect is spoken only in Ancona and has only recently spread its influence elsewhere (Falconara, Osimo, Jesi, Chiaravalle, Porto Recanati, Loreto and Senigallia). Of the Marchigiano varieties, it is the one that shows the most Gallo-Italic traits. Only the speakers from towns which are closer to Macerata (Osimo, Castelfidardo, Loreto, Porto Recanati) use the form  as in Italian. These cities also undergo other influences from the Macerata dialect, due to proximity.

Fabriano dialect 
The Fabriano dialect is spoken in Fabriano (closer to Umbria) and nearby towns.

Macerata dialect 
The Macerata dialect is spoken in the provinces of Macerata and Fermo.

Vocabulary 

The following is a list of Marchigian words; note that the Anconitan forms do not show gemination (etc.)
  (adv. by this time; now); Anconitano: 
  (n. dad; father)
  (adv. in this way)
  (n. hail)
  (vb. to shout; to scream); Anconitano: 
  (adj. thick)
  (adv. yes)
jèmmete (n. cliff)
mata (n. mud)

See also 
Central Italian
Tuscan dialect
Umbrian dialect
Sabin dialect
Marche

External links 
A website about the dialect of Ancona
A blog about the dialect of Macerata

Notes 

Dialects of Italian
Culture in le Marche